The 1997 Uzbek League season was the 6th edition of top level football in Uzbekistan since independence from the Soviet Union in 1992.

Overview
It was contested by 18 teams, and MHSK Tashkent won the championship.

League standings

Top scorer
 Jafar Irismetov, Do'stlik - 23 goals.

References
Uzbekistan - List of final tables (RSSSF)

Uzbekistan Super League seasons
1
Uzbek
Uzbek